Labh Singh (born 25 April 1939) is an Indian athlete. He competed in the men's triple jump at the 1964 Summer Olympics.

References

External links
 

1939 births
Living people
Athletes (track and field) at the 1964 Summer Olympics
Indian male triple jumpers
Olympic athletes of India
Place of birth missing (living people)
Asian Games medalists in athletics (track and field)
Asian Games silver medalists for India
Asian Games bronze medalists for India
Athletes (track and field) at the 1966 Asian Games
Athletes (track and field) at the 1970 Asian Games
Athletes (track and field) at the 1970 British Commonwealth Games
Medalists at the 1966 Asian Games
Medalists at the 1970 Asian Games
Commonwealth Games competitors for India